Three ships have been named Isle of Innisfree:

 , in service under this name 1992–1995
 , in service under this name 1995–2002
 , in service under this name from 2021

Ship names